Noru may refer to:

Noru, several named storms
Non-chan Kumo ni Noru, 1955 Japanese film
NŌRU, an ancient Tamil term for 100